The Dr. Ezekiel Ezra Smith House is a historic house at 135 South Blount Street in Fayetteville, North Carolina.  It is a -story wood-frame structure, with complex massing typical of the Queen Anne architectural style.  Its main block has a side-gable roof, with a projecting bay section at the right of the front facade that is topped by a gable.  A hip roof porch extends from the center of the projecting bay around to the left side.  The house was built in 1902, and is unusual as a Queen Anne house in one of the city's historical African-American neighborhoods.  Dr. Ezekiel Ezra Smith, for whom the house was built, was instrumental in the development of North Carolina's first State Colored Normal School (for the training of African-American teachers), established in Fayetteville in 1877.

The house was listed on the National Register of Historic Places in 2015.

See also

National Register of Historic Places listings in Cumberland County, North Carolina

References

Houses on the National Register of Historic Places in North Carolina
Houses completed in 1936
Houses in Fayetteville, North Carolina
National Register of Historic Places in Cumberland County, North Carolina